The 2001 Wellington local elections were part of the 2001 New Zealand local elections, to elect members to sub-national councils and boards. The Wellington elections cover one regional council (the Greater Wellington Regional Council), eight territorial authority (city and district) councils, three district health boards, and various community boards and licensing trusts.

Wellington City Council
The Wellington City Council consists of a mayor and nineteen councillors elected from six wards (Northern, Onslow, Western, Lambton, Eastern, Southern) using the First-past-the-post voting system.

Mayor

Eastern ward
The Eastern ward returns four councillors to the Wellington City Council. The final results for the ward were:

Lambton ward
The Lambton ward returns four councillors to the Wellington City Council. The final results for the ward were:

Northern ward
The Northern ward returns four councillors to the Wellington City Council. The final results for the ward were:

Onslow ward
The Onslow ward returns two councillors to the Wellington City Council. The final results for the ward were:

Southern ward
The Southern ward returns three councillors to the Wellington City Council. The final results for the ward were:

Western ward
The Western ward returns two councillors to the Wellington City Council. The final results for the ward were:

References

Wellington
Politics of the Wellington Region
Wellington
2000s in Wellington
October 2001 events in New Zealand